Anuchin Glacier is a glacier draining southward to Lake Unter-See in the northern part of the Gruber Mountains, Queen Maud Land. It was discovered, and plotted from air photos, by the Third German Antarctic Expedition, 1938–39. It was mapped from air photos and from surveys by the Sixth Norwegian Antarctic Expedition, 1956–60, and remapped by the Soviet Antarctic Expedition, 1960–61, and named after Dmitry Nikolayevich Anuchin, Soviet geographer.

See also
 List of glaciers in the Antarctic
 Glaciology

References
 

Glaciers of Queen Maud Land
Princess Astrid Coast